Harriet Lane Levy (29 March 1866–15 September 1950) is a California writer best known for her memoir, 920 O’Farrell Street.  Levy was also an avid art collector, a girlhood friend of Alice B. Toklas, and an acquaintance of Gertrude Stein.

Biography

She was born into an upper-middle-class Jewish family and raised in San Francisco.  From 1865-1869, her cousin, Albert A. Michelson (the first U.S. citizen to win a Nobel Prize for science), lived with her. The first part of her autobiography, 920 O’Farrell Street, chronicles her childhood in an upper-middle-class San Francisco neighborhood.  Additionally, young women such as Levy were expected to marry well-off men, which generated additional societal expectations.  However, the intellectually inclined Levy was hesitant to marry early.  Instead, she graduated from the University of California at Berkeley in 1886 and became a prominent writer for popular San Francisco publications, such as the San Francisco Call.  She also wrote for The Wave with notable writers such as Jack London and Frank Norris.  Another one of Levy’s passions was traveling.  She visited Paris many times, the first being with her friends Michael (brother of Gertrude Stein) and Sarah Stein.  She later returned to Paris with Toklas, in 1907, living with her until she moved in with Gertrude Stein in 1910.(Stein, 1934, p. 105-07)   In 1910, she resettled in San Francisco, at the age of 47, continuing to live independently by pursuing her intellectual interests (such as psychology and Christian Science) until her death in 1950.

Connections to Gertrude Stein

Levy was the subject of one of Gertrude Stein's early word portraits. Levy was the subject of much effort on the part of Toklas and Stein to return Levy to San Francisco sans Alice B. Toklas, her original traveling companion. (Stein, 1934, p. 105-07)

Levy wrote a description of the famed Rousseau Banquet which was published in a limited edition of 30 copies, in 1985 as part of a UC Berkeley seminar:  
(discussion of the Levy posthumous publication appears at page 4 of this Charles Hobson catalog).

San Francisco Museum of Modern Art Benefactor

Harriet Lane Levy bequeathed to the San Francisco Museum of Modern Art:
 André Derain, Paysage du midi, 1906 oil on canvas
 Peter David Edstrom, Portrait of Miss Levy, ca. 1907-1908 terracotta
 Henri Manguin, Nu sous les arbres (Nude beneath the Trees) (study), 1905 oil on canvasboard; Corsican Landscape
 Henri Matisse, Corsican Landscape, 1899 oil on canvas; La Table au café (Café Table), ca. 1899 oil on canvas; Le Serf (The Slave), 1900–1903, bronze; Madeleine, I, 1901 bronze; Flowers, 1905 oil on cardboard; Assiette de fruits (Fruit Dish), 1902-1903 oil on canvas 1907; La fille aux yeux verts (The Girl with Green Eyes), 1908 oil on canvas; Grosse tête; Henriette, II (Large Head; Henriette, II), 1927 bronze
 Pablo Picasso, Scène de rue (Street Scene), 1900 oil on canvas

References

Primary sources
 Levy, Harriet Lane, 920 O'Farrell Street.  Doubleday, 1947; Santa Clara University Heyday Books, 1996.  .
 Levy, Harriet Lane, A Supper in Montmartre, Bancroftiana, April 1986.

Secondary sources
 Kellner, Bruce, ed. A Gertrude Stein Companion:  Content with the Example.  New York, Westport, Connecticut, London:  Greenwood Press, 1988. .
 Mellow, James R.  Charmed Circle:  Gertrude Stein & Company.  New York, Washington:  Praeger Publishers, 1974.  .
 Stein, Gertrude.  Harriet in Portraits and Prayers.  New York:  Random House, 1934.  .

External links
 Four short radio readings from 920 O'Farrell Street from California Legacy Project.
 The Right of the People to Peaceably Assemble in Unusual Clothing (pdf file; with selections from Harriet Lane Levy's autobiography)
 Review and Summary of Harriet Lane Levy's autobiography
 Example of bequest by Harriet Lane Levy to the San Francisco Museum of Art.

1867 births
1950 deaths
American women writers
Jewish American writers
Jewish women writers